Andreea Corduneanu (born 26 June 1995) is a Romanian women's football defender, currently playing for Olimpia Cluj. She has been a member of the Romanian national team since 2012. In her career Corduneanu also played for Swiss club Aïre-le-Lignon, Hungarian club Diósgyőri VTK and Heniu Prundu Bârgăului.

Honours 
Olimpia Cluj
Winner
 Romanian Superliga (7): 2011–12, 2012–13, 2013–14, 2014–14, 2015–16, 2016–17, 2017–18
 Romanian Women's Cup (5): 2011–12, 2012–13, 2013–14, 2014–15, 2016–17

References

External links 
 

1995 births
Living people
Sportspeople from Botoșani
Romanian women's footballers
Romania women's international footballers
Women's association football defenders
FCU Olimpia Cluj players
21st-century Romanian women